Shadows and Light is the second album by American vocal group Wilson Phillips, released in 1992 by SBK Records.

Background
Following their best-selling debut album Wilson Phillips, the trio enlisted the production again of Glen Ballard, who had also produced their debut.

The album's songs have a big contrast with the ones on their debut. While the majority of the songs on their debut album are upbeat with positive, lightweight lyrics, Shadows and Light features darker songwriting from the trio that deal with personal issues, such as the estrangement with their fathers ("Flesh and Blood", "All the Way from New York"), or child abuse ("Where Are You?").

The album received mixed reviews and, although a success peaking at number four in the United States and being certified Platinum, it was seen as a commercial failure elsewhere. Three singles were released from the album, and they had much less success than those featured on their debut. The ballad "You Won't See Me Cry" peaked at number 20 on the US Billboard Hot 100, the uptempo "Give It Up" peaked at number 30 and the final single, the ballad "Flesh and Blood" failed to reach the top 100 altogether, peaking at number 119. By the end of the year, Chynna Phillips left the band and the group disbanded for 12 years.

Track listing
 "I Hear You (Prelude)" (Carnie Wilson) – 0:53
 "It's Only Life" (Wilson Phillips, Bob Marlette) – 5:24
 "You Won't See Me Cry" (Wilson Phillips, Glen Ballard) – 3:53
 "Give It Up" (Wilson Phillips, Glen Ballard) – 4:51
 "This Doesn't Have to Be Love" (Wilson Phillips, Glen Ballard) – 4:40
 "Where Are You?" (Chynna Phillips, Glen Ballard) – 5:24
 "Flesh and Blood" (Wilson Phillips, Glen Ballard) – 5:35
 "Don't Take Me Down" (Wilson Phillips, Bob Marlette) – 4:43
 "All the Way from New York" (Chynna Phillips) – 3:37
 "Fueled for Houston" (Wilson Phillips, Glen Ballard) – 4:15
 "Goodbye Carmen" (Wilson Phillips, Glen Ballard) – 5:17
 "Alone" (Wendy Wilson) – 5:17
 "I Hear You (Reprise)" (Carnie Wilson) – 2:06

Personnel 

Wilson Phillips
 Chynna Phillips – lead vocals (2, 3, 6, 9, 11, 13), backing vocals
 Carnie Wilson – lead vocals (3, 5, 7, 10, 11, 13), backing vocals, tambourine (8), acoustic piano (13)
 Wendy Wilson – lead vocals (4, 7, 8, 12, 13), backing vocals
 Vocal arrangements by Glen Ballard and Wilson Phillips.

Musicians
 Robbie Buchanan – synthesizers (2, 8), bass (2)
 Bob Marlette – synthesizers (2, 8), bass (2)
 Greg Phillinganes – acoustic piano (3, 10, 11), bass (3)
 Randy Kerber – synthesizers (3, 5, 7, 9, 10), acoustic piano (5-7, 9), organ (7, 8, 10)
 Glen Ballard – additional synthesizers (3, 5, 7, 9, 10), synthesizers (4, 6, 11-13), bass (4), handclaps (4)
 Michael Landau –  guitar (2, 3, 5-9, 11, 12)
 Steve Lukather – guitar (3, 9)
 Basil Fung – guitar (3, 10)
 James Harrah – guitar (4)
 Michael Thompson – guitar (4)
 Leland Sklar – bass (5, 9)
 Neil Stubenhaus – bass (6-8, 10-12)
 John Robinson – drums (2, 3, 5-12)
 Chris Fogel – handclaps (4)
 Jen Dickenson – handclaps (4)
 Paulinho da Costa – percussion (8, 12)
 Dan Higgins – saxophone (1, 4, 10)
 Kim Hutchcroft – saxophone (1, 4, 10)
 Marc Russo – saxophone (3)
 Gary Grant – trumpet (1, 4, 10)
 Jerry Hey – trumpet (1, 4, 10), horn arrangements (1, 4, 10), string arrangements (3, 9, 11)
 Joshua Trossman – harmonica (10)
 Clayton Haslop – concertmaster (3, 9, 11)
 Christine Ermacoff, Todd Hemmenway and Dennis Karmazyn – cello (3, 9, 11)
 Chuck Domanico and Kenneth Wild – upright bass (3, 9, 11)
 Brian Dembow, Roland Kato, Marlow Fisher and Michael Nowak – viola (3, 9, 11)
 Richard Altenbach, Lily Chen, Ronald Folsom, Reg Hill, Karen Jones, Leslie Katz, Ralph Morrison, Helen Nightengale, Claudia Parducci and Mari Tsmura Botnick – violin (3, 9, 11)
 Horn and string charts prepared by Orion Crawford; Additional preparation by Doug Dana and Jim Surell

Production
 Executive producer – Charles Koppelman
 Produced by Glen Ballard
 Recorded, engineered and mixed by Francis Buckley
 Additional recording by Ted Blaisdell and Julie Last
 Assistant engineers – Tom Biener, Jon Dickinson, Peter Doell, Jon Fundings, Thomas Hardisti, Jusy Kirschner and Charlie Paakkari.
 Technical direction by Chris Fogel and Steve Harrison 
 Mastered by Chris Bellman at Bernie Grundman Mastering (Hollywood, CA).
 Management – Howard Kaufman and Trudy Green

Additional Credits
 Production coordinator – Jolie Levine
 Art direction – Henry Marquez and Margo Chase Design
 Cover photography – Herb Ritts 
 Still life photography – Sydney Cooper

Charts and certifications

Weekly charts

Year-end charts

Certifications

References

Wilson Phillips; Shadows & Light, CD liner notes. SBK Records, 1992.

1992 albums
Albums produced by Glen Ballard
Wilson Phillips albums